The slogan of the Houthi movement (officially called Ansar Allah), a political and religious movement and rebel group in Yemen, reads "God is the greatest, Death to America, Death to Israel, Curse on the Jews, Victory to Islam" in Arabic text. It is often portrayed on a white flag, with the written text in red and green.

Background 

Inspired by the motto of revolutionary Iran, the slogan "Allah is the Greatest, Death to America, Death to Israel, Curse on the Jews, Victory to Islam" was originally not tied to the Houthi movement. Its exact origin is disputed. Some sources state that it was first chanted at the Imam al-Hadi school in Marran in January 2002, while others claim that Hussein Badreddin al-Houthi used it after seeing footage of a young Palestinian dying in his father's arms during the Second Intifada in 2000. The slogan eventually became a sign of public protest against the dictatorship of Yemeni President Ali Abdullah Saleh. It was first widely used during a visit of Sa'dah by Saleh in January 2003. At the time, the President intended to make a speech during the Friday prayers, but was drowned out by locals who chanted the slogan to protest against his policies. The Yemeni government responded with a crackdown, and 600 people were arrested for having used the slogan. This only worsened the situation, however, and the slogan spread in northern Yemen.

The Houthi movement officially adopted the slogan in the wake of the 2003 invasion of Iraq which was widely condemned in the Arab world. This brought the movement on full collision course with the government, as the latter maintained its official pro-American politics despite public opposition. The slogan was outlawed, but the Houthis refused to discard it, arguing that the constitution of Yemen protected free speech. By 2004, crackdowns against both the slogan as well as the Houthi movement intensified. Many Houthis were imprisoned and even tortured for having used it. The conflict between the Houthis and the government eventually resulted in the outbreak of a violent insurgency in the northern country.

Despite the religious overtones of their slogan, the Houthis self-identify as Yemeni nationalist group opposed to the oppression of all Yemenis, including Sunni Muslims, by foreigners. Though the slogan is the most prominent symbol of the Houthi movement, often displayed on placards and flags, the Houthis also display the regular flag of Yemen as a rallying symbol. The Palestinian flag is used, as well, by the Houthi supporters in support of the Palestinian cause.

Some Houthi supporters state that their ire for the U.S. and Israel is directed toward the governments of America and Israel. Ali al-Bukhayti, the spokesperson and official media face of the Houthis, rejected the literal interpretation of the slogan by stating in one of his interview that "We do not really want death to anyone. The slogan is simply against the interference of those governments [i. e., U.S. and Israel]". In the Arabic Houthi-affiliated TV and radio stations they use religious connotations associated with jihad against Israel and the US.

Motto

Gallery

See also
Flag of Yemen
Emblem of Yemen

References

Flag
Flags of organizations
Houthis
National symbols of Yemen
Yemen